Valentine P. Rath (February 15, 1860 - February 25, 1941) was a member of the Wisconsin State Assembly.

Biography
Rath was born on February 15, 1860, in Sheboygan, Wisconsin. Later, he moved to Price, Wisconsin. He was a member of the Knights of Columbus.

On May 15, 1890, Rath married Madelen Mary Friederich. They would have six children, four of whom would serve in World War I.

He died on February 25, 1941.

Career
Rath was a member of the Assembly twice. First, from 1903 to 1924 and second, from 1933 to 1938. Additionally, he was Chairman, Assessor and Clerk of Price and Clerk of Langlade County, Wisconsin. He was a Democrat.

References

Politicians from Sheboygan, Wisconsin
People from Langlade County, Wisconsin
Democratic Party members of the Wisconsin State Assembly
1860 births
1941 deaths